Bergeyella is a rod-shaped, Gram-negative, aerobic, non-spore-forming and non-motile genus from the family of Weeksellaceae.

References

Further reading 
 
 
 
 

Flavobacteria
Bacteria genera